The Coca-Cola Bottling Company of Baltimore Building is a historic industrial building at 2525 Kirk Avenue in Baltimore, Maryland. The Moderne style building was built in 1939.  The building includes hallmarks of the style, including rounded corners, horizontal bands of stonework, and stylized relief panels with renditions of the Coca-Cola Company logo.

The building was listed on the National Register of Historic Places in 2013.

See also
National Register of Historic Places listings in East and Northeast Baltimore

References

Industrial buildings completed in 1939
Industrial buildings and structures on the National Register of Historic Places in Baltimore
Art Deco architecture in Maryland
Coca-Cola buildings and structures